The wedding of Nicholas II of Russia to Alexandra Feodorovna (Alix of Hesse) occurred on  at the Grand Church of the Winter Palace.

Engagement 
On 19 April 1894, Tsarevich Nicholas was at the wedding of Ernest Louis, Grand Duke of Hesse, to their mutual cousin, Victoria Melita of Saxe-Coburg and Gotha. Nicholas had also obtained permission from his parents, Tsar Alexander III and Empress Maria Feodorovna, to propose to Ernst's younger sister, Princess Alix of Hesse and by Rhine, one of the favorite granddaughters of Queen Victoria. The Emperor and Empress had initially been opposed to the match. However, Nicholas, who had first met Alix a decade earlier in St. Petersburg when Alix's sister, Princess Elisabeth of Hesse and by Rhine, married Nicholas's uncle, Grand Duke Sergei Alexandrovich, was not to be dissuaded. Furthermore, Tsar Alexander's health was beginning to fail.

Shortly after arriving in Coburg, Nicholas proposed to Alix. However, Alix, who was a devout Lutheran, rejected Nicholas's proposal, as in order to marry the heir to the throne, she would have to convert to Russian Orthodoxy. However, Alix's cousin, Kaiser Wilhelm II, who had been at the wedding along with their grandmother, Queen Victoria, came to speak to her, insisting that it was her duty to marry Nicholas, despite her religious scruples. Elizabeth also spoke with her, insisting that there were not that many differences between Lutheranism and Orthodoxy. At the prompting of the kaiser, Nicholas proposed for the second time, and she accepted.

On 1 November 1894, Alexander III died at Maley Palace, Livadia, aged forty-nine, leaving twenty-six-year-old Nicholas as tsar of Russia. The following day, Alix, who had arrived at Livadia several days earlier in order to receive the dying tsar's blessing, was received into the Russian Orthodox Church as Grand Duchess Alexandra Feodorovna. Alix had apparently expressed her wish to take the name Catherine, but decided to take the name Alexandra on Nicholas's request.

On 18 November, after nearly two weeks of Orthodox liturgies, and a procession from the Crimea to St. Petersburg, via Moscow, Nicholas's father was interred at the Peter and Paul Fortress.

Marriage

Plans for the wedding, which had been set for the spring of 1895, had been in the works since Nicholas's engagement, and it ordinarily would have included a week of public celebrations and parades. However, the death of Alexander III put an end to such extravagant plans. Nicholas had initially expressed his wish to be married at Livadia before his father's funeral, which Nicholas's mother had agreed with. However, his uncles, Grand Dukes Vladimir, Alexei, Sergei and Paul argued that, as Nicholas was tsar, the wedding should be held in St. Petersburg with some pomp. With Nicholas unwilling to wait until the end of official mourning to marry, it was decided to hold the wedding on his mother's birthday, which would have allowed for court mourning to be somewhat relaxed. Nicholas had also intended to keep the wedding a private family affair, but his uncles had persuaded their nephew to invite the diplomatic corps to watch the procession to and from the cathedral.

Invitations had been sent out, along with a dress code: Russian gentlemen were to wear full regimental dress, bureaucrats were to wear the appropriate uniforms as stipulated  in Peter the Great's Great Table of Ranks; Russian ladies were to come in full court dress, foreign women in evening dresses, with full jewels and awards.

At 11:30 am, on the morning of the wedding, Nicholas departed the Anichkov Palace in an open landau to the Winter Palace, in the company of his sixteen-year-old brother, Grand Duke Michael. Soon after, Nicholas's mother departed for the Sergeivsky Palace in a closed coach, the St. Petersburg residence of Grand Duke Sergei and Grand Duchess Elizabeth, to bring Alexandra to the Winter Palace.

At the Winter Palace, Alexandra was dressed in her wedding dress and imperial mantle. Her Honiton lace veil had been designed by her maternal grandfather Prince Albert and had been worn at the weddings of her mother, Princess Alice (who died in 1878 when Alexandra was six), and her sisters. She also wore the traditional Romanov Imperial Nuptial Crown, a 475 carat necklace and matching earrings that had belonged to Catherine the Great. Across her body, she wore the star and sash of the Order of St. Andrei.

At 12:10, the procession into the Great Church began, with canons of the Peter and Paul Fortress announcing the beginning of the ceremonies. Marie Feodorovna led the procession, accompanying her daughter-in-law to be, with Nicholas walking behind them in his Hussar's uniform, complete with his medals and the orange sash of the Order of Hesse und Bei Rhein.  Along with the Romanov Grand Dukes and Duchess, foreign royal relatives processed into the church, headed up by Nicholas's maternal grandfather, King Christian IX of Denmark. Other relatives included King George I and Queen Olga of Greece (uncle and aunt of Nicholas), and their son, George, the Prince and Princess of Wales (uncle and aunt to both Nicholas and Alexandra), and their eldest surviving son, George, the Duke of York, the Duke and Duchess of Saxe-Coburg-Gotha (uncle and aunt of both Nicholas and Alexandra). Alexandra's brother, Ernest Louis, had come from Germany, as had one of her sisters, Princess Irene, and her husband, Prince Heinrich of Prussia.

The service was presided over by the Archpriest Ioann Yanyshev, the private imperial confessor and chief of the Palace clergy, along with other clergymen. After Nicholas mounted the dais, Marie Feodorovna led Alexandra to the dais, and the priest brought rings on a tray. After blessing them, Yanyshev announced the betrothal of Nicholas to Alexandra to the congregation, and then handed them their rings. After exchanging them three times, Nicholas and Alexandra knelt and exchanged formal wedding vows, with Nicholas's best men, Grand Dukes Michael, Cyril Vladimirovich, Sergei Mikhailovich and Prince George of Greece holding the nuptial crowns above their heads. Following being led around the lectern, they knelt and kissed a gold cross, and following a final prayer, Nicholas and Alexandra were pronounced man and wife, at which point the church bells across St. Petersburg rang and guns were fired from the Peter and Paul Fortress.

Due to court mourning, there was no reception, nor honeymoon, with Nicholas and Alexandra going to reside with his mother and brother at the Anichkov Palace. In time, however, Nicholas and Alexandra would move to the Alexander Palace at Tsarskoye Selo.

Guests

The groom's family 
 The Empress Dowager of Russia, mother of Nicholas II
 Grand Duchess Xenia Alexandrovna and Grand Duke Alexander Mikhailovich of Russia, sister and brother-in-law (also first cousin once removed) of Nicholas II
 Grand Duke Michael Alexandrovich of Russia, brother of Nicholas II
 Grand Duchess Olga Alexandrovna of Russia, sister of Nicholas II
 Grand Duke Vladimir Alexandrovich and Grand Duchess Marie Pavlovna of Russia, paternal uncle and aunt of Nicholas II
 Grand Duke Cyril Vladimirovich of Russia, first cousin of Nicholas II
 Grand Duke Boris Vladimirovich of Russia, first cousin of Nicholas II
 Grand Duke Andrei Vladimirovich of Russia, first cousin of Nicholas II
 Grand Duchess Elena Vladimirovna of Russia, first cousin of Nicholas II
 Grand Duke Alexei Alexandrovich of Russia, paternal uncle of Nicholas II
 Grand Duke Sergei Alexandrovich and Grand Duchess Elizabeth Fyodorovna of Russia, paternal uncle and aunt of Nicholas II; brother-in-law and sister of Alexandra
 Grand Duke Paul Alexandrovich of Russia, paternal uncle of Nicholas II 
 Grand Duchess Alexandra Iosifovna of Russia, paternal grandaunt by marriage of Nicholas II
 Grand Duke Konstantin Konstantinovich and Grand Duchess Elizabeth Mavrikievna of Russia, first cousin once removed of Nicholas II, and his wife
 Grand Duke Dmitri Konstantinovich of Russia, first cousin once removed of Nicholas II
 Duchess Vera of Württemberg, first cousin once removed of Nicholas II (representing the King of Württemberg)
 Grand Duke Michael Nikolaevich of Russia, paternal granduncle of Nicholas II
 Grand Duke Nicholas Mikhailovich of Russia, first cousin once removed of Nicholas II
 Grand Duke George Mikhailovich of Russia, first cousin once removed of Nicholas II
 Grand Duke Sergei Mikhailovich of Russia, first cousin once removed of Nicholas II
 The King of Denmark, maternal grandfather of Nicholas II 
 The King and Queen of the Hellenes, maternal uncle and aunt (also first cousin once removed) of Nicholas II
 Prince George of Greece and Denmark, first cousin of Nicholas II
 Prince Valdemar of Denmark, maternal uncle of Nicholas II

The bride's family

 The Grand Duke of Hesse and by Rhine, brother of Alexandra
 Princess and Prince Henry of Prussia, sister and brother-in-law (also first cousin) of Alexandra (representing the German Emperor)
 The Prince and Princess of Wales, uncle and aunt of both Alexandra and Nicholas (representing the Queen of the United Kingdom)
 The Duke of York, Alexandra and Nicholas' mutual first cousin
 The Duke and Duchess of Saxe-Coburg and Gotha, uncle and aunt of both Alexandra and Nicholas
 The Crown Prince of Romania, husband of Alexandra and Nicholas' mutual first cousin (representing the King of the Romanians)

Foreign royalty 

 Duke John Albert of Mecklenburg, second cousin once removed of Nicholas II (representing the Grand Duke of Mecklenburg-Schwerin)
 Prince Wilhelm and Princess Maria Maximilianovna of Baden, second cousin once removed of both Nicholas and Alexandra, and first cousin once removed of Nicholas II (representing the Grand Duke of Baden)
 The Duke of Leuchtenberg, first cousin once removed of Nicholas II
 Prince George Maximilianovich and Princess Anastasia of Leuchtenberg,  first cousin once removed of Nicholas II and his wife
 Duke Alexander Petrovich and Duchess Eugenia Maximilianovna of Oldenburg, second cousin once removed and first cousin once removed of Nicholas II (cousin of the Grand Duke of Oldenburg)
 Duke Peter Alexandrovich of Oldenburg, second cousin of Nicholas II
  Duke Constantine Petrovich of Oldenburg, second cousin once removed of Nicholas II
 Duke Georg Alexander of Mecklenburg-Strelitz, second cousin once removed of Nicholas II (nephew of the Grand Duke of Mecklenburg-Strelitz)
 Duke Karl Michael of Mecklenburg-Strelitz, second cousin once removed of Nicholas II
 Prince and Princess Albert of Saxe-Altenburg, third cousin once removed of both Nicholas and Alexandra, and second cousin once removed of Nicholas II (representing the Duke of Saxe-Altenburg)

References

1890s in Saint Petersburg
1894 in the Russian Empire
Russia
Marriage, unions and partnerships in Russia
Nicholas II of Russia
November 1894 events
Russia